The men's Ice hockey tournament at the 2017 Asian Winter Games was held in Sapporo, Japan between 18 and 26 February at three venues (Tsukisamu Gymnasium, Mikaho Gymnasium and the Hoshioki Skating Rink).

A total of 18 men's teams competed in three divisions (four in Top Division, six in Division I and eight in Division II), with only the top division being eligible for the medals. Originally 20 teams were scheduled to compete, however Bahrain later withdrew. Iran was also scheduled to compete, however after arriving, more than half the team was deemed ineligible to represent the country due to eligibility issues. Thus the team was disqualified. However the country still played its matches as friendlies, but they did not count towards the standings.

The Kuwait Olympic Committee was suspended in October 2015, due to political interference. Therefore, the country competed under the Olympic flag as Independent Olympic Athletes.

According to the IIHF World Ranking, Kazakhstan were the highest rated team in men's ice hockey, followed by Japan, South Korea, China, Hong Kong and the United Arab Emirates. All other nations were unranked.

Squads

Results
All times are Japan Standard Time (UTC+09:00)

Division II

Preliminary round

Group A

Group B

Final round

3rd place

Final

Division I

Top division

Final standing

References

External links
Official Results Book – Ice Hockey
IIHF

Men's tournament